Philippe Dajoux (born 23 March 1968 in Marseille) is a French actor and film director.

Biography 
After training as an actor, he made film clips, short and long features. He has worked in television since 2006, notably making 277 episodes of the series Plus belle la vie and 24 episodes of Seconde Chance.

Filmography 
 1997 : Gueules d'amour
 1999 : Les Collègues
 2001 : La Grande Vie !
 2005 : Une belle histoire
 2006 : Plus belle la vie (TV series)
 2008 : Seconde Chance (TV series)
 2015 : Deux au carré

References

External links 
 
 Philippe Dajoux at Allocine 

French film directors
French television directors
Mass media people from Marseille
1968 births
Living people